

Sponsorship

Club

Coaching staff
{|class="wikitable"
|-
!Position
!Staff
|-
|Manager|| U Kyi Lwin
|-
|rowspan="1"|Assistant Manager|| U Soe Min
|-
|Goalkeeper Coach||
|-
|Fitness Coach||
|-

Other information

|-

General Aung San Shield

First team squad

References

 Magway FC

External links
 First Eleven Journal in Burmese
 Magway FC

Magway